In psychology, genetic memory is a theorized phenomenon in which certain kinds of memories could be inherited, being present at birth in the absence of any associated sensory experience, and that such memories could be incorporated into the genome over long spans of time. 

While theories about the inheritance of specific memories have been thoroughly disproven, some researchers have asserted that more general associations formed by previous generations can pass from generation to generation through the genome. For instance, experts today are still divided on how to interpret a study which suggested that mice may be able to inherit an association between certain smells and a fear response formed by previous generations of mice. Contemporary theories are based on the idea that the common experiences of a species can become incorporated into that species' genetic code, not by a Lamarckian process that encodes specific memories, but by a much vaguer tendency to encode a readiness to respond in certain ways to certain stimuli.

Language
Language, in the modern view, is considered to be only a partial product of genetic memory. The fact that humans can have languages is a property of the nervous system that is present at birth, and thus phylogenetic in character. However, perception of the particular set of phonemes specific to a native language only develops during ontogeny. There is no genetic predisposition towards the phonemic makeup of any single language. Children in a particular country are not genetically predisposed to speak the languages of that country, adding further weight to the assertion that genetic memory is not Lamarckian. However, there is scientific evidence of a gene for perfect pitch which is more common in Asian countries where pitch is critical to the meaning of a spoken word.

Research
Neuroscientific research on mice suggests that some experiences can influence subsequent generations. In a 2013 study, mice trained to fear a specific smell passed on their trained aversion to their descendants, which were then extremely sensitive and fearful of the same smell, even though they had never encountered it, nor been trained to fear it.

Changes in brain structure were also found. The researchers concluded that "the experiences of a parent, even before conceiving, markedly influence both structure and function in the nervous system of subsequent generations".

Scientists speculate that similar genetic mechanisms could be linked with phobias, anxiety, and post-traumatic stress disorders, as well as other neuropsychiatric disorders, in humans.

Historical views
In contrast to the modern view, in the 19th century, biologists considered genetic memory to be a fusion of memory and heredity, and held it to be a Lamarckian mechanism. Ribot in 1881, for example, held that psychological and genetic memory were based upon a common mechanism, and that the former only differed from the latter in that it interacted with consciousness. Hering and Semon developed general theories of memory, the latter inventing the idea of the engram and concomitant processes of engraphy and ecphory.  Semon divided memory into genetic memory and central nervous memory.

This 19th-century view is not wholly dead, albeit that it stands in stark contrast to the ideas of neo-Darwinism. In modern psychology, genetic memory is generally considered a false idea. However, biologists such as Stuart A. Newman and Gerd B. Müller have contributed to the idea in the 21st century.

See also
 Adaptive memory
 Collective memory—a sociological concept
 Epigenetics
 Instinct
 Psychological nativism

References

Further reading
 
  Note that the definition talks of "information based upon" learning and experience, rather than about learning and experience themselves.

Memory
Analytical psychology